Borogovia is a troodontid theropod dinosaur genus which lived during the Late Cretaceous Period, in what is now Mongolia.  

In 1971, a Polish-Mongolian expedition discovered the remains of a small theropod at the Altan Ula IV site, in the Nemegt Basin of Ömnögovĭ province. In 1982, upon describing Hulsanpes perlei, the find was reported by Halszka Osmólska and considered by her to be a possible specimen of Saurornithoides. Later she concluded that it represented a species new to science.

In 1987, Osmólska named and described the type species Borogovia gracilicrus. The generic name is derived from the fantasy avian creatures known as 'borogoves' in the Lewis Carroll poem "Jabberwocky", in Through the Looking-Glass. The specific name is a combination of Latin gracilis, "lightly built", and crus, "shin", in reference to the elegant build of the lower leg.

The holotype specimen, ZPAL MgD-I/174, was found in the Nemegt Formation, dating from the early Maastrichtian. It consists of two lower legs of a single individual, including fragments of both tibiotarsi, the undersides of both metatarsi and the second, third and fourth toes of each foot.

The tibiotarsi have an estimated length of twenty-eight centimetres. Borogovia is about two meters (6 feet) long, weighing some twenty kilograms (forty-five pounds). The tibiotarsus is very elongated. The third toe is narrow. The second phalanx of the second toe is short. The claw of the second toe is short and relatively flat. Osmólska claimed that the second toe could not be hyperextended, and suggested that it had regained a weight-bearing function, compensating for the weakness of the third toe. In 2021, Andrea Cau and Daniel Madzia have called this the "falchiporan condition".

Borogovia was assigned by Osmólska to the Troodontidae in 1987.

See also

 Timeline of troodontid research

References

Troodontids
Late Cretaceous dinosaurs of Asia
Fossil taxa described in 1987
Taxa named by Halszka Osmólska
Nemegt fauna